No More Days to Waste is the debut album by German pop punk band Aloha from Hell. It was released on January 16, 2009. The singles "Don't Gimme That", "Walk Away", "No More Days to Waste" and "Can You Hear Me Boys" were released from the album. Track ten "Girls Just Wanna Have Fun" is a cover of the original song by Cyndi Lauper. There are also two more covers: "Catch Me If You Can", original by Ana Johnsson and "How Come You Are The One" by Markus Fagervall.

Track listing

Singles

References
http://music.myspace.com/index.cfm?fuseaction=music.artistalbums&artistid=1499747&albumid=13808656
http://www.alohafromhell.de/audio.html

2009 debut albums
Aloha from Hell albums